The Canton of Gamaches  is a canton situated in the department of the Somme and in the Hauts-de-France region of northern France.

Geography 
The canton is organised around the commune of Gamaches.

Composition
At the French canton reorganisation which came into effect in March 2015, the canton was expanded from 20 to 36 communes:

Aigneville
Allery
Bailleul
Beauchamps
Bettencourt-Rivière
Biencourt
Bouillancourt-en-Séry
Bouttencourt
Bouvaincourt-sur-Bresle
Buigny-lès-Gamaches
Chépy
Citerne
Dargnies
Doudelainville
Embreville
Érondelle
Feuquières-en-Vimeu
Fontaine-sur-Somme
Frettemeule
Frucourt
Gamaches
Hallencourt
Huppy
Liercourt
Limeux
Longpré-les-Corps-Saints
Maisnières
Martainneville
Mérélessart
Ramburelles
Saint-Maxent
Sorel-en-Vimeu
Tilloy-Floriville
Vaux-Marquenneville
Vismes 
Wiry-au-Mont

Population

See also
 Somme
 Arrondissements of the Somme department
 Cantons of the Somme department
 Communes of the Somme department

References

Gamaches